Fleming - is a coat of arms of Flemish origin. It was used by the Flemming family in the times of the Polish–Lithuanian Commonwealth.

History

Notable bearers
 Izabela Czartoryska née Flemming
 Jerzy Detloff Fleming

Polish coats of arms